Dame Sonia Rosemary Susan Proudman, DBE (born 30 July 1949), styled The Hon. Mrs Justice Proudman, is a retired judge of the High Court of England and Wales.

Education
Proudman was educated at St Paul's Girls' School and Lady Margaret Hall, Oxford.  She was one of the first female winners of the Eldon Scholarship.

Career
Proudman was called to the Bar, Lincoln's Inn in 1972. She became a Bencher in 1996 and a Recorder in 2000. She was a Deputy High Court Judge from 2001 to 2008, until she was appointed to the Chancery Division on a full-time basis.  She was the second woman assigned to the Chancery Division, after Mary Arden.

Proudman was made a Dame Commander of the Order of the British Empire in 2008.

Proudman retired from the bench on 2 October 2017.

Arms
Proudman obtained a grant of arms in 2009.

References

External links
 Notice of knighthood
 Biodata

1949 births
Living people
Alumni of Lady Margaret Hall, Oxford
British barristers
British King's Counsel
British women judges
Chancery Division judges
Dames Commander of the Order of the British Empire
Fellows of Lady Margaret Hall, Oxford
People educated at St Paul's Girls' School
20th-century King's Counsel
21st-century King's Counsel